Döhle bodies are light blue-gray, oval, basophilic, leukocyte inclusions located in the peripheral cytoplasm of neutrophils. They measure 1-3 μm in diameter. Not much is known about their formation, but they are thought to be remnants of the rough endoplasmic reticulum.

They are named after German pathologist, Karl Gottfried Paul Döhle (1855-1928). They are often present in conjunction with toxic granulation. However, it has been found that certain healthy individuals may have persistent Döhle bodies found in neutrophils.


Associated conditions
They are seen in:
 Burns
 Infection
 Physical trauma
 Neoplastic diseases
 Fanconi syndrome
 May–Hegglin anomaly
 Chédiak–Steinbrinck–Higashi's syndrome
 Leukemoid reaction

Pathophysiology
The presence of Döhle bodies in mature and immature neutrophils on a blood smear can be normal if they are present only in small numbers. They are also normally more abundant in cats and horses. Döhle bodies are intra-cytoplasmic structures thought to be composed of endoplasmic reticulum material; they will increase in number with inflammation and increased granulocytopoiesis.  If there are many neutrophils in the bloodstream containing Döhle bodies, these can be referred to as toxic neutrophils. Toxic neutrophils can also correspond to neutrophils that possess a more basophilic cytoplasm, basophilic granulation (infrequently observed), or cytoplasmic vacuoles in addition to one of the preceding cytoplasmic changes. Döhle bodies, cytoplasmic basophilia and cytoplasmic granulation all reflect "defects" in cell production and maturation during active granulocytopoiesis. Just like a left shift, the presence of toxic neutrophils suggests increased granulocytopoiesis. However, in a freshly prepared blood smear, the presence of vacuolation in addition to toxic neutrophils reflects endotoxemia resulting in autolysis of neutrophils. This autodigestion is responsible for the cytoplasmic vacuolation. It is the single toxic change that does not result from the "manufacturing" process.

References

Histopathology
Abnormal clinical and laboratory findings for blood